The Cobram Courier, also published as Yarroweyah, Strathmerton, Katamatite, Burramine & Berrigan News, is a weekly English language newspaper published in Cobram, Victoria, Australia.

History 
The Cobram Courier was published from 12 September 1888 to 28 December 1995, by Victoria Heller & Marston, Cobram. From 1996, it has been published by Newsprinters, a subsidiary of McPherson Media Group.

The paper is published every Wednesday, and reports on news, community and sporting events from the townships of Cobram, Barooga, Strathmerton, Tocumwal, Katamatite and surrounding districts.

It has a circulation of 2,606 within a population of 6,308 in the prime circulation area.

Digitalization 
The paper has been digitalized as part of the Australian Newspapers Digitisation Program of the National Library of Australia and is available online.

See also 
List of newspapers in Australia

References

External links
 
 Newsprinters
 McPherson Newspapers
 The Cobram Courier online

Newspapers published in Victoria (Australia)
Newspapers on Trove
Weekly newspapers published in Australia